The first election to Newry, Mourne and Down District Council, part of the Northern Ireland local elections on 22 May 2014, returned 41 members to the newly formed council via Single Transferable Vote. Sinn Féin and the Social Democratic and Labour Party won the most seats, with 14 each, with Sinn Féin taking a plurality of first-preference votes.

Results by party

Districts summary

|- class="unsortable" align="centre"
!rowspan=2 align="left"|Ward
! % 
!Cllrs
! %
!Cllrs
! %
!Cllrs
! %
!Cllrs
! %
!Cllrs
! %
!Cllrs
! %
!Cllrs
!rowspan=2|TotalCllrs
|- class="unsortable" align="center"
!colspan=2 bgcolor=""| Sinn Féin
!colspan=2 bgcolor=""| SDLP
!colspan=2 bgcolor="" | DUP
!colspan=2 bgcolor="" | UUP
!colspan=2 bgcolor="" | Alliance
!colspan=2 bgcolor="" | UKIP
!colspan=2 bgcolor="white"| Others
|-
|align="left"|Crotlieve
|34.5
|2
|bgcolor="#99FF66"|43.4
|bgcolor="#99FF66"|3
|2.5
|0
|9.5
|0
|0.0
|0
|0.0
|0
|10.1
|1
|6
|-
|align="left"|Downpatrick
|28.3
|1
|bgcolor="#99FF66"|50.9
|bgcolor="#99FF66"|3
|2.2
|0
|5.7
|0
|0.0
|0
|0.0
|0
|12.9
|1
|5
|-
|align="left"|Newry
|bgcolor="#008800"|51.7
|bgcolor="#008800"|3
|31.6
|1
|0.0
|0
|4.4
|0
|0.0
|0
|0.0
|0
|12.3
|1
|6
|-
|align="left"|Rowallane
|7.9
|0
|19.0
|1
|bgcolor="#D46A4C"|27.3
|bgcolor="#D46A4C"|2
|26.2
|1
|7.3
|1
|0.0
|0
|12.3
|0
|5
|-
|align="left"|Slieve Croob
|bgcolor="#008800"|32.5
|bgcolor="#008800"|2
|24.8
|1
|14.8
|1
|10.4
|0
|10.0
|1
|5.9
|0
|1.6
|0
|5
|-
|align="left"|Slieve Gullion
|bgcolor="#008800"|62.2
|bgcolor="#008800"|4
|23.3
|2
|3.4
|0
|11.1
|1
|0.0
|0
|0.0
|0
|0.0
|0
|7
|-
|align="left"|The Mournes
|bgcolor="#008800"|28.5
|bgcolor="#008800"|2
|23.8
|2
|9.0
|1
|17.0
|1
|2.4
|0
|18.1
|1
|1.2
|0
|7
|- class="unsortable" class="sortbottom" style="background:#C9C9C9"
|align="left"| Total
|37.1
|14
|30.4
|14
|7.6
|4
|12.0
|3
|2.4
|2
|3.9
|1
|6.6
|3
|41
|-
|}

District results

Crotlieve

2014: 3 x SDLP, 2 x Sinn Féin, 1 x Independent

Downpatrick

2014: 3 x SDLP, 1 x Sinn Féin, 1 x Independent

Newry

2014: 3 x Sinn Féin, 2 x SDLP, 1 x Independent

Rowallane

2014: 2 x DUP, 1 x UUP, 1 x SDLP, 1 x Alliance

Slieve Croob

2014: 2 x Sinn Féin, 1 x SDLP, 1 x DUP, 1 x Alliance

Slieve Gullion

2014: 4 x Sinn Féin, 2 x SDLP, 1 x UUP

The Mournes

2014: 2 x Sinn Féin, 2 x SDLP, 1 x UKIP, 1 x UUP, 1 x DUP

* Incumbent

Changes during the term

† Co-options

‡ Changes in affiliation 

Last updated 25 March 2019.

Current composition: see Newry, Mourne and Down District Council.

References

2014 Northern Ireland local elections
21st century in County Armagh
21st century in County Down
Elections in County Armagh
Elections in County Down